Svatopluk Turek (25 October 1900 in Hodslavice – 30 December 1972 in Zlín) was a Czechoslovak novelist, known under pen name T. Svatopluk.

After studying arts at the university he worked as graphics designer in Baťa company in Zlín.
He is most known for his book Botostroj (The Shoe Machine) where he depicted the company as an inhuman mechanism destroying lives of people and its boss Tomáš Baťa as a dictator. The novel is written in very fast, expressive language.

Family of Tomáš Baťa sued for defamation and tried in various ways to stop publishing the book.

Works
 Botostroj, 1933 (The Shoe Machine)
 Bez šéfa, (Without the boss) - sequel, after the company was nationalized
 Mrtví země
 Andělé úspěchu
 Gordonův trust žaluje (also named Pán a spisovatel)
 Hrdinové z ostrova
 Švédský mramor

See also
Bata shoe factory (East Tilbury)

1900 births
1972 deaths
People from Nový Jičín District
Czechoslovak novelists